James Williamson (5 April 1876 – 17 April 1956) was an Australian rules footballer who played with South Melbourne in the Victorian Football League (VFL).

Family
The son of James Williamson, and Ann Williamson (1856-1928), née Ellims, James Williamson was born in Ballarat, Victoria  on 5 April 1876.

Notes

References

External links 

1876 births
1956 deaths
Australian rules footballers from Victoria (Australia)
Sydney Swans players
Ballarat Football Club players